Christian I (February 1426 – 21 May 1481) was a Scandinavian monarch under the Kalmar Union. He was king of Denmark (1448–1481), Norway (1450–1481) and Sweden (1457–1464). From 1460 to 1481, he was also duke of Schleswig (within Denmark) and count (after 1474, duke) of Holstein (within the Holy Roman Empire). He was the first king of the House of Oldenburg.

In the power vacuum that arose following the death of King Christopher of Bavaria (1416–1448) without a direct heir, Sweden elected Charles VIII of Sweden (14081470) king with the intent to reestablish the union under a Swedish king. Charles was elected king of Norway in the following year. However the counts of Holstein made the Danish Privy Council appoint Christian as king of Denmark. His subsequent accessions to the thrones of Norway (in 1450) and Sweden (in 1457), restored the unity of the Kalmar Union for a short period. In 1463, Sweden broke away from the union and Christian's attempt at a reconquest resulted in his defeat by the Swedish regent Sten Sture the Elder at the Battle of Brunkeberg in 1471.

In 1460, following the death of his uncle, Duke Adolphus of Schleswig, Count of Holstein, Christian also became Duke of Schleswig and Count of Holstein.

Biography

Early years
Christian I was born in February 1426 in Oldenburg in Northern Germany as the eldest son of Count Dietrich of Oldenburg by his second wife, Helvig of Holstein (died 1436). Christian had two younger brothers, Maurice (1428–1464) and Gerhard (1430–1500), and one sister Adelheid.

Through his father, he belonged to the House of Oldenburg, a comital family established since the 12th century in an area west of the River Weser in north-western Germany. Based on the two strongholds of Oldenburg and Delmenhorst, the family had gradually expanded its rule over the neighbouring Frisian tribes of the area. Christian's father was called the Fortunate as he had reunited and expanded the family's territory. Christian's mother, Helvig, was a daughter of Gerhard VI, Count of Holstein, and a sister of Adolphus, Duke of Schleswig. Through his mother, Christian was also a cognatic descendant of King Eric V of Denmark through his second daughter Richeza (died 1308) and also a cognatic descendant of King Abel of Denmark through his daughter Sophie. Through his father, Christian was a cognatic descendant of King Eric IV of Denmark through his daughter Sophia. Christian thus descended from the three surviving sons of Valdemar II and his second wife Berengaria of Portugal.

At the death of their father in 1440, Christian and his brothers jointly succeeded Dietrich as Count of Oldenburg and Delmenhorst. Christian was raised by his uncle, Duke Adolphus of Schleswig, Count of Holstein (1401–1459) as the childless duke wished for his young nephew to become his heir, and also succeeded in having Christian elected as his successor in the Duchy of Schleswig.

King of Denmark

In January 1448, King Christopher of Denmark, Sweden and Norway died suddenly and without natural heirs. His death resulted in the break-up of the union of the three kingdoms, as Denmark and Sweden went their separate ways and Norway's affiliation was unclear. The vacant Danish throne was first offered by the Council of the Realm to Duke Adolphus of Schleswig, being the most prominent feudal lord of Danish dominions. The duke declined and recommended his nephew, Count Christian of Oldenburg. Before being elected, Christian had to promise to obey to the Constitutio Valdemariana, a provision in the ascension promissory of King Valdemar III of Denmark, that promised that in the future, the same person could never be both ruler of the Duchy of Schleswig and Denmark simultaneously. The council also demanded that Christian should marry dowager queen Dorothea of Brandenburg (ca 1430–1495), widow of his predecessor King Christopher III. On 1 September 1448, after signing his ascension promissory, count Christian was elected to the Danish throne as king Christian I at the assembly in Viborg. His coronation was held on 28 October 1449, in the Church of Our Lady in Copenhagen, at which occasion his marriage with dowager queen Dorothea was also celebrated.

King of Sweden and Norway

Meanwhile, Sweden had on 20 June 1448 elected Charles (VIII) as king of Sweden. Norway was now faced with the choice between a union with Denmark or Sweden, or electing a separate king. The latter option was quickly discarded, and a power-struggle ensued between the supporters of Christian of Denmark and Charles of Sweden. The Norwegian Council of the Realm was divided. In February 1449, a part of the Council declared in favour of Charles as king, but on 15 June the same year, a different group of councillors paid homage to Christian. On 20 November, Charles was crowned king of Norway in Trondheim.

However, the Swedish nobility now took steps to avoid war with Denmark. In June 1450, the Swedish Council of the Realm forced Charles to renounce his claim on Norway to King Christian.  In the summer of 1450, Christian sailed to Norway with a large fleet, and on 2 August he was crowned king of Norway in Trondheim. On 29 August, a union treaty between Denmark and Norway was signed in Bergen. Norway had of old been a hereditary monarchy, but this had become less and less a reality, as at the last royal successions, hereditary claims had been bypassed for political reasons. It was now explicitly stated that Norway, as well as Denmark, was an elective monarchy. The treaty stipulated that Denmark and Norway should have the same king in perpetuity, and that he would be elected among the legitimate sons of the previous king, if such existed.

Charles Knutsson became increasingly unpopular as king of Sweden, and was driven into exile in 1457. Christian achieved his aim of being elected as king of Sweden, thus re-establishing the Kalmar Union. He received the power from temporary Swedish regents Archbishop Jöns Bengtsson Oxenstierna and lord Erik Axelsson Tott. However, Sweden being volatile and split by factions (benefits of union being against nationalistic benefits), his reign there ended in 1464 when Kettil Karlsson Vasa, Bishop of Linköping was installed as the next regent. Charles Knutsson was recalled as King of Sweden, although he was later exiled a second time, recalled again and died during his third term as king. Christian's final attempt at regaining Sweden ended in a total military failure at the Battle of Brunkeberg (outside Stockholm) October 1471 where he was defeated by forces on Swedish regent Sten Sture the Elder. Christian maintained his claim to the Swedish kingdom up to his death in 1481.

Duke and Count
In 1460 King Christian also became Duke of Schleswig, a Danish fief, and Count of Holstein-Rendsburg, a Saxe-Lauenburgian subfief within the Holy Roman Empire. Christian inherited Holstein-Rendsburg and Schleswig after a short "interregnum" as the eldest son of the sister of late Duke Adolphus VIII, Duke of Schleswig (Southern Jutland) and Count of Holstein, of the Schauenburg fürst clan, who died 4 December 1459, without heirs. Christian's succession was confirmed by the Estates of the Realm (nobility and representatives) of these duchies in Ribe 5 March 1460 (Treaty of Ribe). In 1474 Lauenburg's liege lord Emperor Frederick III elevated Christian I as Count of Holstein to Duke of Holstein, thus becoming an immediate imperial vassal (see imperial immediacy).

Later reign

Christian's personal territory was at its largest in 1460–1464, before the loss of Sweden. However, many parts of his realm wanted to govern themselves locally, and there were constant struggles. Denmark was his most important center of power.

In 1474 Christian travelled two times: in April he went to Milan (his stay in Lombardy is celebrated by frescoes by Il Romanino in the Malpaga Castle) and Rome, in Italy, where he met Pope Sixtus IV. In the autumn same year he visited Charles of Burgundy, acting as intermediary between him and future emperor Maximilian I. He stayed in Burgundy for several months, moving to the Netherlands in the early 1475.

Acting on a permission from Pope Sixtus IV in 1475 to establish a university in Denmark, the University of Copenhagen was inaugurated by Christian on 1 June 1479.

Death and burial

King Christian died at Copenhagen Castle on 21 May 1481 at the age of 55. He was interred at the Chapel of the Magi at Roskilde Cathedral, a richly decorated chapel he and Queen Dorothea had erected to serve as a family sepulchral chapel for the House of Oldenburg. The burials of Christian I and Queen Dorothea are marked with a pair of simple stones, as the chapel itself was to be considered their sepulchral monument.

Legacy
The dynasty he founded, the House of Oldenburg, remains on the throne of Denmark. It was on the throne of Norway until 1818, returning there again from 1905, and also on the throne of Sweden during Christian's reign there and those of his son and grandson, but also 1751–1818.

Arms

Ancestry

Danish royal descent

Issue

See also
 List of Danish monarchs
 Danish monarch's family tree

References

Bibliography

External links

 The Royal Lineage at the website of the Danish Monarchy

|-

|-

|-

|-

|-

 
1426 births
1481 deaths
15th-century Swedish monarchs
15th-century monarchs of Denmark
15th-century Norwegian monarchs
Rulers of Finland
Kalmar Union
Dukes of Schleswig
Dukes of Holstein
Counts of Holstein
Christian 06
Burials at Roskilde Cathedral
Swedish monarchs of German descent